Valhalla Dancehall is a studio album from the Brighton-based indie rock band Sea Power, then known as "British Sea Power". It was released in January 2011.

The album's title was revealed on 13 October 2010. The band's official website displayed a release date of 10 January. The Canadian website of their record label listed a release date of 18 January.

The first single from the album, "Living Is So Easy", was released digitally on 29 November 2010.

The album was recorded in South East England and on the Isle of Skye, and produced by British Sea Power and Graham Sutton.

The song "Georgie Ray" was inspired by George Orwell and Ray Bradbury, according to Yan and Wood in an interview with musicOMH.

The song "Cleaning Out The Rooms" first appeared on the Zeus EP, as did a different version of "Mongk II" entitled "Mongk".

Regarding the album's title, the band have merely stated that "Valhalla Dancehall" is possibly "just a glorified farmhouse that sometimes runs out of oil."

Track listing

Valhalla V.I.P. EP
Independent record stores in the UK sold initial copies of the album with an additional EP, entitled Valhalla V.I.P..

References

British Sea Power albums
2011 albums
Rough Trade Records albums